The Yellow Typhoon is a 1920 American silent drama film directed by Edward José and written by Monte M. Katterjohn. It is based on the 1919 novel The Yellow Typhoon by Harold MacGrath. The film stars Anita Stewart, Ward Crane, Donald MacDonald, Joseph Kilgour, George Fisher, and Ed Brady. The film was released on May 3, 1920, by First National Exhibitors' Circuit.

Cast       
Anita Stewart as Hilda / Berta Nordstorm
Ward Crane as John Mathison
Donald MacDonald as Robert Hallowell
Joseph Kilgour as Karl Lysgaard
George Fisher as M. Andre Duval
Ed Brady as Morgan

References

External links

1920 films
1920s English-language films
Silent American drama films
1920 drama films
First National Pictures films
Films directed by Edward José
American silent feature films
American black-and-white films
1920s American films